Orange is an unincorporated community in Lawrence County, in the U.S. state of Missouri.

History
A post office called Orange was established in 1894, and remained in operation until 1903. The origin of the name Orange is uncertain.

References

Unincorporated communities in Lawrence County, Missouri
Unincorporated communities in Missouri